Headnut.tv is a German television series.

See also
List of German television series

External links
 

2002 German television series debuts
2004 German television series endings
German comedy television series
German-language television shows
ProSieben original programming